Horizons Specialist Academy Trust is a multi-academy trust (MAT) that operates five special schools with academy status across northern England. It is an exempt charity, regulated by the Department for Education.

Philosophy
The trust champions the right of students with special educational needs. It is committed to helping to develop into:
 confident individuals who are positive about who they are and what they can do,
 successful enthusiastic and motivated learners,
 positive participants in the local and wider communities. 
     
It will do this by quality, expert teaching, providing a range of teaching and non-teaching professionals who have a comprehensive skill set and flexible teaching to enable the student to successfully move on to the next learning stage and personal independence.

History
The trust was founded in 2013, growing out of the Abbey Hill single academy trust. It was joined by the other academies the following years.

It was a founder member of the Northern Alliance of Trusts.

Academies
 Abbey Hill Academy

 Green Gates Academy

 Westlands Academy

 Hollis Academy

 Mo Mowlam Academy

References

Academy trusts